Corey Lamon Bradford (born December 8, 1975) is a former American football wide receiver. He played for the Green Bay Packers, Houston Texans, and Detroit Lions.

High school years
Bradford attended Clinton High School in Clinton, Louisiana, and was a four-year letterwinner in football, basketball, and track & field. In football, he won All-State honors at defensive back as a senior, and was the starting quarterback for two years. In basketball, he won All-District honors, and in track & field, he won the state long jump title as a junior.

Junior college years
Bradford attended Hinds Community College in Raymond, Mississippi for two years and garnered two varsity letters in track and field.

Jackson State University
Bradford attended Jackson State University, and played football his senior year. He was named the Southwestern Athletic Conference "Newcomer of the Year", and was a first-team All-SWAC selection. He finished his impressive season with 48 receptions for 937 yards (19.5 yards per rec. avg.)

Professional career

Bradford was drafted in the 5th round of the 1998 NFL Draft by the Green Bay Packers. He played in Green Bay for four years before signing with the Houston Texans as a free agent in March 2002. On March 15, 2006, Bradford signed a four-year contract with the Detroit Lions, which included a $2 million signing bonus; he was released on September 27, 2006 and re-signed with the team on November 16, 2006. On July 26, 2007, he signed with the Redskins and was released on September 1, 2007. Bradford scored 25 receiving touchdowns in his career.

NFL career statistics

References

1975 births
Living people
Players of American football from Baton Rouge, Louisiana
American football wide receivers
Hinds Eagles football players
Jackson State Tigers football players
Green Bay Packers players
Houston Texans players
Detroit Lions players